Ip dip is a rhythmic counting-out game with many variations, the purpose of which is to select an individual from a group, for instance to choose the starting player of a game.  It has been commonly used in British playgrounds for many years.

The speaker of the rhyme points to a different person in order as each stressed syllable is spoken; the person pointed to as the final syllable is spoken is thereby elected.

The aim is to delay and distract from counting the syllables or otherwise fixing the result; the rhyme should be so long that the speaker loses count and cannot predict the chosen person.  Perhaps this unpredictability is the reason that there are so many variations, including the practice of stringing variations together — which may be considered cheating.

Examples 

A Welsh version of the rhyme runs:

Ip dip dip /
My blue [or little] ship /
Sailing on the water /
Like a cup and saucer, /
But you are not in it. 

Another version, from Northern Ireland, runs:

Ip dip sky blue, /
Granny sitting on the loo, /
Doing farts, playing darts, /
Out goes you! /
O-U-T spells Out!

A common Australian version goes:

Dip, dip, dog shit /
Who trod in it? /
What colour was it? /
Who saw it? /
(Say the name of a colour) /
(Name a biblical figure) /
You are not it.

Other recorded versions include:

Ip dip sky blue /
Who's it, not you!

A variation of this version was featured on Bluey:

Ip dip sky blue /
Who's it not you! /
Not because you're dirty, /
Not because you're clean. /
My mum says you're the fairy queen! /

Ip dip doo, /
The cat's got the flu, /
The dog's got the chickenpox , /
So out goes you.

Ip dip doo /
Doggy did a poo /
Went to the cinema at half-past two /
When the film started /
Everybody farted /
Out goes you.

A version from World War One was recorded by Thomas Ringlestone:

Ip dip doo /
The cat's got the flu /
The cat's got the plague /
I choose you!

Another version popular in the Vatican City runs:

Ip dip dog shit /
Fucking bastard silly git /
You are not it /
You tit.

The last version is taken from a booklet of children's rhymes from 1803:

Ip dip don't slip /
You'll break your leg and become a crip /
Do you leememba /
Fly, Leela a Benda /
Who will it be?

See also
 Akka bakka bonka rakka
 Eeny, meeny, miny, moe
 En Den Dino
 Cumbric counting: Yan tan tethera

References

Children's games